Namibia  competed at the 2019 World Aquatics Championships in Gwangju, South Korea from 12 to 28 July. This was the nation's thirteenth appearance at the FINA World Aquatics Championships since 1994. The Namibia Swimming Union sent three competitors, with Phillip Seidler competing in the open water swimming while Xander Skinner and Ronan Wantenaar  competed in the pool.

Open water swimming

Namibia qualified one male open water swimmer.

Swimming

Men

References

World Aquatics Championships
2019
Nations at the 2019 World Aquatics Championships